The Bangladesh national basketball team is the national basketball team representing Bangladesh. It is administrated by the Bangladesh Amateur Basketball Federation. The team's top achievement to date was the bronze medal at the 2010 South Asian Games.

Olympic Games and World Championship record
Bangladesh has never qualified for Basketball at the Summer Olympics or the FIBA World Championship.

Asian Championship record
Bangladesh won their 1st international Championship in 2013, winning the FIBA Asia SABA Championship.

Bangladesh has yet to prove it can compete against Asia's basketball elite. The team still waits for its first victory at the FIBA Asia Championship. Its best finish was 13th in 1979.

Competitions

FIBA Asia Cup

SABA Championship

References

External links
Bangladesh league on Asiabasket.com

Men's national basketball teams
National sports teams of Bangladesh
Basketball in Bangladesh